Yavuz is a village in the Ardeşen District, Rize Province, in Black Sea Region of Turkey. Its population is 256 (2021).

History 
According to list of villages in Laz language book (2009), name of the village is Cuneliangvan, which means "sunny angvan". Most villagers are ethnically Laz.

Geography

References

Villages in Ardeşen District
Laz settlements in Turkey